Columbia is an unincorporated community in Franklin Township, Tuscarawas County, Ohio, United States. It is located near Strasburg, Parral, and Dover. Despite being in Franklin Township, Columbia uses Dover's Zip Code, 44622.

References

Unincorporated communities in Ohio
Unincorporated communities in Tuscarawas County, Ohio